All My Demons Greeting Me as a Friend is the debut studio album by Norwegian singer-songwriter Aurora. It was released on 11 March 2016 by Decca and Glassnote Records. The album followed the release of her debut extended play (EP) Running with the Wolves (2015), which contained two songs that were later included on the album. Aurora collaborated with several producers including Odd Martin Skålnes, Magnus Skylstad, Nicolas Rebscher, Alf Lund Godbolt, and Electric during its recording.

All My Demons Greeting Me as a Friend has been described predominantly as an electropop album, along with folk, electronic, synth-pop, Nordic-folk, and alternative pop that explores fantasy, heartache, life, and death through its lyrics. The album was met with positive reviews from music critics. At the Spellemannprisen '16, All My Demons Greeting Me as a Friend won Pop Solo Artist and was nominated for Album of the Year; the music video of the song "I Went Too Far" won Music Video of the Year. Commercially, the album topped the Norwegian albums chart in its first week, while also reaching the top 50 in various North American and European countries, in addition to attaining modest positions on several European charts. The album was certified platinum in Norway, and has sold more than 500,000 copies worldwide.

Six singles supported the album, all of which were supplemented by accompanying music videos. "Runaway" became a sleeper hit six years later and peaked at number one on the Billboard Bubbling Under Hot 100 in the United States. The second single, "Running with the Wolves" reached number 72 in Germany, becoming her first song to chart in that country. An acoustic version of "Murder Song (5, 4, 3, 2, 1)" was released in August 2015 while its studio version was released a month later. Her cover of the song "Half the World Away" by Oasis was released for the 2025 John Lewis Christmas advert and included in the album's deluxe edition. The singles "Conqueror", "I Went Too Far", and "Winter Bird" were released throughout 2016.

Background and development
Aurora began playing piano at the age of six, but it wasn't until she became nine that she decided to compose her own songs. When a live performance at her high school's leaving ceremony and a recording of her song "Puppet" were uploaded online, it was quickly discovered by a representative of the Norwegian management agency of Artists Made Management. Even though she initially denied the proposal, she accepted it since her mother advised her that "maybe there's someone out there who desperately needs [her music]." In a few hours, both songs received thousands of visits in Norway, which earned Aurora some recognition in her country, in addition to a fan base on Facebook.

After releasing a series of non-album singles, she followed with the release of her debut EP Running with the Wolves in May 2015, which received positive reviews from online music blogs and national press. ​Aurora embarked on a short tour in cities of the United States and the United Kingdom to promote it.

Like in Running with the Wolves, most of the album was recorded at Lydriket Studios, located in her native Bergen, while additional recording was taken at The Engine Room and Angel Recording Studios in London. Band members from her live band, Magnus Skylstad and Odd Martin Skålnes produced most of the songs from the album. The songs from the album were written from Aurora's childhood to March 2015, when the album was finished. In early 2016, Aurora featured in British band Icarus' song "Home" and released a cover of David Bowie's "Life on Mars" for the HBO Girls television series.

Music and lyrics

All My Demons Greeting Me as a Friend is mainly an electropop, folk, electronic, synth-pop, Nordic-folk, and alternative pop record, featuring elements of art pop, new age, disco, and trip hop. The album is mostly a collection of experiences that Aurora wrote about while growing up in her native Norway. According to her, the record is mainly "about bad experiences from the past that can be good memories, [and about] come to peace with everything that happened." Lyrical nature themes throughout the record present vivid lyricisms about fantasy, heartache, life, and death. The productions of the record has been characterised as "minimalist" with spacy electronics, pulsating beats, yearning modalities, and synth-driven sounds. Critics compared the record to the music of artists like Björk, Lorde, Lykke Li, Florence Welch, Goldfrapp, and Enya.

Songs
All My Demons Greeting Me as a Friend opens with the folktronica and synth-pop number "Runaway". The song featured echoing water droplet effects, screeches, and transitions. Aurora has stated that the song takes an influence from Nordic folk music and is about "a girl begging to go home – the only place where she belongs, or just the only place left to go". The second track, "Conqueror", is a synth-pop and electropop song that features "clattering drum beats building towards a euphoric chorus". The track has been described to be "poppy" and "playful", musically upbeat with a catchy percussive beat, sparkling synths, and a battle-ready chorus. The Scandipop song, "Running with the Wolves" serves as the third track. Its lyrics is about "the dawning realisation that the answer is to be found in this world, however damaged it might be". The fourth track, "Lucky", is a piano and organ-led ballad with lyricisms about "someone striving against their inner voice telling them to give in". "Winter Bird" is the fifth track which has been described as a new age-tinged folk, Nordic folk, and "Enya-ambient-folk dream" with nature themed lyrics. The sixth track, "I Went Too Far" is a disco-inflected pop and synth-pop ballad. The ballad has been described as "solemn" with a synth-swirling chorus and dance-insistent beat.

"Through the Eyes of a Child" is the seventh track, it has been described as an "icily atmospheric" ballad that "showcases [a] lovely piano and voice". The eighth track, "Warrior" has an upbeat uptempo sound that showcases the brighter side of the record with a vulnerable and authentic self-love inspired message. The lyrics are about someone "struggling to let love back into their life". Ninth track, "Murder Song (5, 4, 3, 2, 1)" is a solemn and shimmering ballad with a "creeping" title that has a smooth and synthy minor. Lyrically, the ballad speaks about a mercy killing of a protagonist "recounting the story of her own death". The tenth track, "Home" has been described as a "chilly, almost robotic" song. Eleventh track "Under the Water" and twelfth track "Black Water Lillies", share the same subject about drowning and death within the lyrics. On "Under the Water", the ballad talks about the romanticisation of drowning. The closing track of the standard edition, "Black Water Lilies" follows the same theme as "Under The Water". "Black Water Lilies" features extended notes, reverberating piano, and simple beats, about "overcoming forces both in the natural and mental realms".

Release and promotion

Aurora initially announced that the album was expected for release in September 2015, but was later postponed. During that time, she revealed that some of the songs were "less dreamy" and "more happy" in comparison to previous ones and concluded that "it's not just a sad and dark record, there is some hope in it [...] which is nice!" Months later, Aurora announced in January 2016 that the album would be released on 11 March of the same year. The album in its standard and deluxe editions was issued on 11 March 2016, by Decca and Glassnote Records. An international deluxe edition was released digitally for several countries on 26 August 2016.

To promote the album, Aurora did several performances. She performed at the 2015 Nobel Peace Prize Concert, saying that she and her family "have been following it from the living room at home for many years", and "it is an incredibly beautiful thing to be a part of." Her presentation was praised by the concert's host Jay Leno. She has played a sold-out headline show in London and supported Of Monsters and Men at Brixton Academy in November 2015. On 14 March 2016, Aurora made her American television debut on The Tonight Show Starring Jimmy Fallon, performing "Conqueror", which was later performed on Conan. She also starred in her own short documentaries: "Into the Light",  and "Nothing is Eternal", directed by Isaac Ravishankara and produced by The Fader. She also partnered with YouTube for a creative content distribution program, becoming the first in a series of emerging artists.

Tour
The album received further promotion from her second headlining concert tour, the All My Demons Tour, which began on 7 January 2016 in London, United Kingdom. The tour included dates in various countries including: Australia, United Kingdom, Germany, United States, and her native Norway. With more than two hundred public appearances around 2016, Aurora suffered from constant health problems (including loss of voice) and in December of that year her cecum was emergency removed in a hospital, which prevented her from fulfilling her last three concerts in the United States. She said in 2019 that her success that year meant a difficult time in her personal life, having to deal with panic attacks and accepting that making music had become a job that involved "share" herself with the world. However, this led her to conclude that she must get better herself before she could help others.

Critical reception

All My Demons Greeting Me as a Friend received generally positive reviews from music critics. At Metacritic, which assigns a normalised rating out of 100 to reviews from mainstream critics, the album received an average score of 80, which indicates "generally favorable reviews", based on 10 reviews. Writing for Entertainment Weekly, Madison Vain commended Aurora's vocals and production and added that the record "channels a similar magical vibe as the art-pop superstar [Björk]".

Accolades
All My Demons Greeting Me as a Friend won the GAFFA Awards for Norwegian Album of the Year and the Spellemannprisen '16 for Pop Solo Artist and Music Video of the Year for the song "I Went Too Far". At the latter ceremony the album was nominated for Album of the Year. She was also awarded a plaque on the Bergen Walk of Fame, which is located on Nøstegaten Street in the Nøstet district.

Track listing
All tracks produced by Odd Martin Skålnes and Magnus Åserud Skylstad, except where noted.

Notes
  signifies an additional producer.
  signifies a remixer.
 "Conqueror" contains elements of "Now We Are Free" by Lisa Gerrard.
 Physical releases of the album title "Murder Song (5, 4, 3, 2, 1)" as "Murder Song".

Personnel 
Credits adapted from the liner notes of All My Demons Greeting Me as a Friend.

Musicians
 Aurora Aksnes – vocals ; piano ; synth 
 Alf Lund Godbolt – synth ; programming 
 Nicolas Rebscher – synth ; keyboards ; programming 
 Odd Martin Skålnes – synth ; piano ; drums & percussion ; programming ; bass guitar ; acoustic guitar 
 Magnus Åserud Skylstad – synth ; piano ; drums & percussion 
 Øystein Skar – synth 
 Pete Davis – keyboards & programming 
 Michelle Leonard – keyboards & programming 
 Edvard Erfjord – programming 
 Henrik Michelsen – programming 
 Matias Monsen – cello 
 Askjell Solstrand – wurlitzer organ 
 Geoff Lawson – conductor (The Royal Philharmonic Orchestra) 
 The Royal Philharmonic Orchestra – orchestra 

Technical
 Magnus Åserud Skylstad – production & recording , mixing 
 Neil Comber – mixing 
 Odd Martin Skålnes – production & recording , mixing 
 Jeremy Wheatley – additional production, programming & mixing 
 Alex Wharton – mastering 
 Edvard Erfjord – production & recording 
 Henrik Michelsen – production & recording 

Artwork
 Jane Long – artwork, graphics, design
 Knut Skylstad – photography
 Bent René Synnevåg – photography

Charts

Certifications

Release history

See also
 List of number-one albums in Norway

References

External links
 
 

2016 debut albums
Albums produced by Magnus Skylstad
Albums produced by Electric (music producers)
Decca Records albums
Glassnote Records albums
Aurora (singer) albums
European Border Breakers Award-winning albums